Roderick Ryan (15 November 1909 – 23 October 1979) was an Australian cricketer. He played four first-class matches for Western Australia in 1933/34.

See also
 List of Western Australia first-class cricketers

References

External links
 

1909 births
1979 deaths
Australian cricketers
Western Australia cricketers